Siegfried Breuer Jr. (né Walter Breuer; 1930–2004) was an Austrian film actor. He was the son of the actor Siegfried Breuer.

Filmography

References

Bibliography
 Fritsche, Maria. Homemade Men in Postwar Austrian Cinema: Nationhood, Genre and Masculinity. Berghahn Books, 2013.

External links

1930 births
2004 deaths
Austrian male film actors
Austrian male television actors
20th-century Austrian male actors
Male actors from Vienna